Members group of Peace and Justice, or Peace and Justice for short, is a South Korean parliamentary grouping that was formed on 2 April 2018. The technical group consists of Party for Democracy and Peace and Justice Party.

History 
Both Democracy and Peace and Justice were non-parliamentary groups in South Korea, due to the law requiring at least 20 members to form a parliamentary group. Democracy and Peace and Justice, with 14 and 6 members of the National Assembly respectively, chose to form a parliamentary group to bolster their voices in the National Assembly after rounds of negotiations. The grouping became the fourth parliamentary group after Democratic Party of Korea, Liberty Korea Party and Bareunmirae Party. The grouping was automatically dissolved with the death of Justice Party lawmaker Roh Hoe-chan on July 23, falling below the 20-member requirement.

References

2018 establishments in South Korea
Justice Party (South Korea)
Liberal parties in South Korea
Political parties established in 2018